The media of New Orleans serve a large population in the New Orleans area as well as southeastern Louisiana and coastal Mississippi.

Newspapers

Historically, the major newspaper in the area has been The Times-Picayune; it is published three times a week on Wednesdays, Fridays and Sundays. The "Times-Pic" made headlines of its own in 2012 when owner Advance Publications cut back from daily publication, instead focusing its efforts on its website, nola.com. That action briefly made New Orleans the largest city in the country without a daily newspaper, until the Baton Rouge newspaper The Advocate began a New Orleans edition in 2013. Later in 2013 the New Orleans edition became The New Orleans Advocate. In 2019, the papers merged to form The Times-Picayune  The New Orleans Advocate.

The New Orleans Tribune and The Louisiana Weekly serve the city with an African American focus. The Clarion Herald is the official newspaper of the Roman Catholic Archdiocese of New Orleans. OffBeat is a monthly music magazine. Gambit is a free alternative weekly newspaper; Where Y'at? is a free monthly. Healthcare Journal of New Orleans covers the city's healthcare issues. The Tulane Hullabaloo is the weekly student-run newspaper of Tulane University. New Orleans CityBusiness is published in Metairie, but covers the weekly business news of the New Orleans metropolitan area. The Neutral Ground News is an Onion-like, online satirical news publication focusing on the people, places and things of the greater New Orleans area.

Television stations

HDTV channels are in green.

†Indicates analog low power station

Radio

AM radio

FM radio

Internet radio

See also
New Orleans in fiction
 Louisiana media
 List of newspapers in Louisiana
 List of radio stations in Louisiana
 List of television stations in Louisiana
 Media of locales in Louisiana: Baton Rouge, Lafayette, Monroe, Shreveport, Terrebonne Parish

References

Bibliography

External links
 

 
New Orleans